Pedro Andre Shigueishi Ynamine Kitano (born 14 October 1998) is a Peruvian-Japanese footballer who plays as a goalkeeper.

Club career

Early life and youth career
Ynamine was born in Peru, but moved to Japan at the age of one, where he stayed for 15 years. In Japan, Ynamine only played football in the school. As soon as he returned to Lima, he joined Universidad San Martín after a trial. He then had a short stint at Sport Boys, where he also made his first team debut in the Peruvian Segunda División in May 2016.

Return to Universidad San Martín
Ynamine returned to Universidad San Martín for the 2018 after a short stint at Sport Boys. On 21 July 2018, Ynamine got his official debut for San Martín in the Peruvian Primera División against Deportivo Binacional. Ynamine was in the starting lineup in a game San Martín lost 0–2.

In January 2020, he extended his contract for one further year.

UTC Cajamarca
On 7 December 2021, Ynamine signed with UTC Cajamarca for the 2022 season. He left the club at the end of the year, as his contract expired.

International career
As for the result of having Japanese origin, he is qualified to represent for either Peru or Japan.

In 2014–2015, Ynamine represented the Peruvian U17 national team in the 2015 South American U-17 Championship. He was also a part of the squad, participating in the 2017 South American U-20 Championship, however as the second choice, so he didn't make any appearances.

In January 2020, Ynamine was also a part of the squad, which was called up for the 2020 CONMEBOL Pre-Olympic Tournament. Also this time, he was the second choice and made no appearances.

References

External links
 

Living people
1998 births
Association football goalkeepers
Peru youth international footballers
Peruvian footballers
Japanese footballers
Peruvian people of Japanese descent
Peruvian Segunda División players
Peruvian Primera División players
Sport Boys footballers
Club Deportivo Universidad de San Martín de Porres players
People from Lima